Lembah Jaya is a township in Selangor, Malaysia, located near Ampang.

Townships in Selangor